"Git It" is the second single from Bun B's debut album Trill.  It features the Ying Yang Twins and is produced by Mr. Collipark. It peaked at number 22 on the U.S. rap chart. This song is also a remake of the song "Get It Girl" which was done by the Miami-based rap duo 2 Live Crew and released in 1986 from their album The 2 Live Crew Is What We Are.

It is also credited as The Ying Yang Twins featuring Bun B.

Charts

References

2005 songs
2006 singles
Bun B songs
Songs written by Mr. Collipark
Asylum Records singles
Songs written by Bun B
Crunk songs